GCET can refer to:

 GCET Jammu, an engineering college in Jammu, India
 Gujarat Common Entrance Test: entrance exam conducted for admission to MBA and MCA colleges of Gujarat, India
 G H Patel College Of Engineering & Technology, an engineering college in Vallabh Vidyanagar, India
 GCET Greenfield Community Energy & Technology, an Internet Provider in Greenfield, Massachusetts